Daniel Tschan (born 17 June 1960) is a Swiss weightlifter. He competed in the men's middle heavyweight event at the 1984 Summer Olympics.

References

External links
 

1960 births
Living people
Swiss male weightlifters
Olympic weightlifters of Switzerland
Weightlifters at the 1984 Summer Olympics
Place of birth missing (living people)